Éric Boniface (born 2 November 1969 in Paris) is a French former professional footballer who played as a defender. He made 10 appearances in Ligue 1 for FC Sochaux-Montbéliard in the 1998–99 season. He coached at USC Paray and is now a coach at Dijon.

Boniface also played 283 matches in Ligue 2 for Sochaux, Stade de Reims, CS Louhans-Cuiseaux and FC Gueugnon between 1990 and 2002.

His younger brother Frédéric also played football professionally.

Honours
Gueugnon
 Coupe de la Ligue: 1999–2000

References

Living people
1969 births
Association football defenders
French footballers
Footballers from Paris
FC Sochaux-Montbéliard players
Stade de Reims players
Louhans-Cuiseaux FC players
FC Gueugnon players